Several works by or after Titian have been entitled Portrait of a Lady, including:
 La Schiavona, 1510–1512
 Portrait of a Lady (Titian, Chicago), 
 Woman Holding an Apple, 
 Portrait of a Lady in White,